Blessed Cassien of Nantes was a Capuchin priest, missionary and martyr.  Born Gonzalve Vaz Lopez-Netto on 14 January 1607 in Nantes to parents of Portuguese ancestry, he traveled with fellow Capuchin Blessed Agathange of Vendome through Syria, Egypt and Ethiopia.  Accused of preaching to the Copts, they were ordered to be killed by a blow to the head by the King of Gondar.  They were martyred on 7 August 1638.

References 

Breton beatified people
1607 births
1638 deaths